Yuval Sharon is an American opera and theater director from Naperville, Illinois, based in Los Angeles. In 2017, he won the MacArthur Genius Grant.

Early life and education

Sharon was born in 1979 in Chicago to two Israeli parents. He earned a B.A. in 2001 from the University of California, Berkeley studying English and dramatic arts, before spending a year in Berlin. Seeing Wozzeck as a college student and his time in Berlin both led him towards opera.

Sharon then lived in New York, where he founded a theater company called Theater Faction and worked at the New York City Opera, directing its VOX program from 2006 to 2009, before moving to Los Angeles. He found Los Angeles to be the ideal home for experimental work in opera and founded The Industry to put on innovative productions.

Career

Sharon continues to serve as artistic director of The Industry in Los Angeles, dedicated to new and experimental opera. Notable productions include Hopscotch, an opera staged in 24 moving vehicles; Christopher Cerrone's Invisible Cities, based on the Italo Calvino novel and staged in Union Station (Los Angeles), and Anne LeBaron's Crescent City, set in a mythical town loosely based on New Orleans. Sharon has also done two performance installations: Terry Riley's In C at the Hammer Museum and Nimbus at Walt Disney Concert Hall. In 2012 Sharon was Associate Director of the world premiere of Stockhausen's Mittwoch aus Licht with Graham Vick for the London 2012 Cultural Olympics.

Sharon is currently artist-collaborator at the Los Angeles Philharmonic, where his projects will include an original setting of Orson Welles's The War of the Worlds, with music by Annie Gosfield, performed both inside and outside the concert hall simultaneously in Fall 2017, and a staging of Mahler's Das Lied von der Erde with Gustavo Dudamel in Spring 2018.

Sharon also directed John Cage's Song Books at the San Francisco Symphony and Carnegie Hall with Joan La Barbara, Meredith Monk, and Jessye Norman. Recent productions include Péter Eötvös's Tri sestry (Three Sisters) at the Vienna State Opera, a new performance edition of Lou Harrison's Young Caesar at the Los Angeles Philharmonic, and Pelléas et Mélisande at the Cleveland Orchestra. His production of Leoš Janáček's The Cunning Little Vixen, originally produced at the Cleveland Orchestra, will be the first fully staged opera ever presented in Vienna's historic Musikverein in October 2017. Sharon will also be the first American director at the Bayreuth Festival in 2018.

On September 9, 2020, Yuval Sharon was named the Gary L. Wasserman Artistic Director for the Michigan Opera Theater (as of February 2022 renamed to Detroit Opera).

Awards
 2014 Götz Friedrich Prize in Germany for his production of John Adams's Doctor Atomic.
 2017 Foundation for Contemporary Arts Grants to Artists award.

References

Further reading

External links
 
 The Industry's website

1979 births
MacArthur Fellows
Living people
People from Chicago
American opera directors